Wilcox, Texas may refer to the following places:

Wilcox, Burleson County, Texas, in Burleson County, Texas
Wilcox, Somervell County, Texas

See also 
 Wilcox (disambiguation)